75D may refer to:

 HP-75D, handheld computer introduced in 1984
 Tesla Model X 75D, all-electric cross-over SUV (XUV/CUV)
 75D/Kohoutek, a short-period comet discovered in February 1975 by Lubos Kohoutek

See also
 D75 (disambiguation)
 75 (disambiguation)